Khrushchev is one of numerous transliterations of the Russian male surname Хрущёв. Its feminine counterpart is Khrushcheva (Хрущёва). Notable people with the surname include:

Leonid Khrushchev (1917–1943), missing aviator
Lyudmila Khrushcheva (born 1955), Russian racewalker
Nikita Khrushchev (1894–1971), leader of the Soviet Union from 1953 to 1964
Nikita Khrushchev (journalist) (1959–2007), grandson of Nikita Khrushchev Sr.
Nina Kukharchuk (1900–1984), wife of Nikita Khrushchev Sr.
Nina L. Khrushcheva (born 1964), great-granddaughter of Nikita Khrushchev Sr.
Sergei Khrushchev (1935-2020), engineer and son of Nikita Khrushchev Sr.

See also
Khrushchev: The Man and His Era, a 2003 biography of Nikita Khrushchev
Kid Kruschev, a 2017 album by Sleigh Bells
Smash (wrestler) (born 1959), who also used the stage name Krusher Khruschev

Russian-language surnames